The 69th edition of the Kuurne–Brussels–Kuurne cycling classic was held on 26 February 2017. It was part of the 2017 UCI Europe Tour and ranked as a 1.HC event. It was the second and concluding race of the Belgian opening weekend, the year's first road races in Northwestern Europe, one day after Omloop Het Nieuwsblad.

Sagan and four other riders – Belgians Jasper Stuyven and Tiesj Benoot, Italy's Matteo Trentin, riding for the Belgian  team, and 's Luke Rowe from Great Britain – contested a sprint finish, being the survivors of a larger group that broke away from the peloton around the halfway mark of the race, after the Oude Kwaremont.

Teams
Twenty-five teams were invited to start the race. These included fourteen UCI WorldTeams, nine UCI Professional Continental teams and two UCI Continental teams.

Results

References

External links

2017
2017 UCI Europe Tour
2017 in Belgian sport